Diposis is a genus of flowering plants belonging to the family Apiaceae.

Its native range is Southern South America.

Species:

Diposis bulbocastanum 
Diposis patagonica 
Diposis saniculifolia

References

Azorelloideae
Apiaceae genera